Paratype is a genus of moths in the subfamily Arctiinae first described by Felder in 1874.

Species
 Paratype basivitta Walker, 1854
 Paratype ira Druce, 1889
 Paratype nigra Reich, 1936
 Paratype trifera Walker, 1869
 Paratype univitta Hampson, 1900

References

Lithosiini
Moth genera